Jacques Alexandria Samossoud (September 8, 1894 – June 14, 1966) was a Russian composer and conductor.

Biography 
He was born on September 8, 1894. In 1924 he married the Crimean-born Greek soprano Thalia Sabanieva; they divorced in 1926. He conducted the orchestra of the Washington National Opera from 1919 to 1936. He left during a contract dispute.

He married Mark Twain's daughter, Clara Langdon Clemens (1874–1962) in 1944 at Clara's Hollywood, California home.

He died on June 14, 1966.

References 

Russian composers
Russian male composers
1894 births
1966 deaths
Clemens family
20th-century composers
Burials at Woodlawn Cemetery (Elmira, New York)
20th-century Russian male musicians
Emigrants from the Russian Empire to the United States